Kidston Dam also known as Copperfield Dam is a dam in Lyndhurst, Shire of Etheridge, Queensland, Australia. The mine closed July 2001.

History 
This storage and associated pipeline was built to provide water to the Kidston Goldmine in the early 1980s on the Copperfield River, a tributary of the Einasleigh River in the Gilbert River catchment. The dam was one of the first dams built in Australia using the roller compacted concrete technique.

At the closure of the mine in 2001, the dam was handed back to the Queensland Government and is owned/ managed by the Queensland Department of Energy and Water Supply (DEWS). Downstream properties receive water via a pipeline which was built to supply the mine and associated township. There is also a local arrangement to release water (towards the end of winter) to fill downstream waterholes. This allows riparian properties access to water for stock and domestic use until the coming wet season.

Kidston Pumped Storage Project 
The Kidston Solar Project is a  solar farm on the former mine's tailings heap. It has been generating electricity into the National Electricity Market (NEM) since December 2017, and the Kidston Dam is suggested to supply pumped storage hydroelectricity for matching supply and demand between solar farm and grid. The project was upgraded to  solar and  pumped storage, at an expected cost of $330 million in 2017. The project signed a 10-year power purchase agreement with EnergyAustralia in 2020, backed by a $610 million loan from the Northern Australia Infrastructure Facility, and a $47 million grant from the Australian Renewable Energy Agency. Completion is expected by 2024 at a cost of A$777 million. A 186 kilometre single-circuit transmission line from Kidston to Mount Fox. Construction began in 2021.

The upper reservoir for the Kidston Pumped Storage Project holds 3.75 mn cubic meters of water as active storage, and 1.03 mn cubic meters as extended storage. The lower reservoir holds 3.25 mn cubic meters of water as active storage, and 1.5 mn cubic meters as extended storage. There is an average drop of 200 meters between the two reservoirs, ranging from 181m to 218m.

Fishing
The area is popular with recreational fisherman. In recent years the dam has seen an exponential growth in the redclaw population.

Access for fishing boats is via a steep dirt and rock boat ramp next to the dam wall.

See also

List of dams and reservoirs in Australia

References

External links
 Natural Resources and Water
 Australian Natural Resources Atlas

Reservoirs in Queensland
Dams completed in 2001
North West Queensland
Dams in Queensland